Dancing in the Dust is a 2003 Iranian drama film directed by Asghar Farhadi.

Plot
Under pressure from his relatives, Nazar an Azerbaijani young man who lives in the immigrants district, divorces his wife Reyhane, and all he can do for his divorced wife is to arrange for payment of her marriage dowry on installments. Nazar encounters great difficulties in raising money for the monthly installments.

Cast
 Faramarz Gharibian as The Old Man
 Baran Kosari as Rayhaneh
 Yousef Khodaparast as Nazar

Awards and nominations

References

External links
 

2003 films
Iranian drama films
2000s Persian-language films
Films directed by Asghar Farhadi
2003 drama films